Rompivalasa is a village in Srikakulam district of the Indian state of Andhra Pradesh. It is located in Pathapatnam mandal.

Etymology

It is said that the place was once affected by the floods of the Mahendra Tanaya river, so the nearby villagers named it rompi valasa, which literally means "mud village".

Demographics 

 census, Rompivalasa had a population of 1,795. The total population constitute, 907 males and 888 females —a sex ratio of 979 females per 1000 males. 168 children are in the age group of 0–6 years. The average literacy rate stands at 58.02% with 944 literates, significantly lower than the district average of 61.70%.

Education
The village's ZPH School is the main source of education. It was established in 1996. The school land was donated by Kottapalli Gangayya Achari and others.

References

Villages in Srikakulam district